Potassium-transporting ATPase alpha chain 2 is a protein that in humans is encoded by the ATP12A gene.

Function 

The protein encoded by this gene belongs to the family of P-type cation transport ATPases. This gene encodes a catalytic subunit of the ouabain-sensitive H+/K+ -ATPase that catalyzes the hydrolysis of ATP coupled with the exchange of H+ and K+ ions across the plasma membrane. It is also responsible for potassium absorption in various tissues.

References

External links

Further reading